= 1935 Vermont marble strike =

In November 1935, workers of the Vermont Marble Company went on strike. The action attracted national attention and ended in early 1936 through arbitration.
